Kissin' George (foaled 1963 in California) was an American thoroughbred racehorse, considered one of America's premier sprint horses of the late 1960s. Kissin' George was out of a Head Play mare called Nothead. He was sired by Slamruler, a grandson of Nearco through his son, Nasrullah.

Kissin' George was active for two time periods, 1966-1969 and 1973-74. Although he lost to Dr. Fager on two occasions when stretching beyond his preferred six furlong distance, he was a dominant force at sprint race distances.

Career statistics
1966 age 3; 2 starts, won both for earnings of $6,875.
1967 age 4; 8 starts winning 7 and coming 2nd once for $65,200.
1968 age 5; 12 starts with 6 wins and 3 places for $111,812.
1969 age 6; 8 starts with 4 wins and 2 places for $62,650.
1973 age 10; 18 starts 2 wins 5 places and 2 shows for $11,480.
1974 age 11; 14 starts 5 wins 4 places  and 1 show for $13,383.

See also
 List of historical horses

References
 Kissin' George's pedigree and partial racing stats
 Los Angeles Times - August 20, 1967 article on Kissin' George winning the Bing Crosby Handicap
 New York Times - December 27, 1967 article on DeCourcey Graham's Kissin' George winning the Palos Verdes Handicap
 The Times-News (Hendersonville, North Carolina) - October 24, 1968 article on Kissin' George winning the Sport Page Handicap

1963 racehorse births
Thoroughbred family 9-e
Racehorses bred in California
Racehorses trained in the United States